The genus Lithium is a group of four described species of aphid wasps, occurring from Mali to Turkey

References

Crabronidae
Fauna of Mali
Insects of Turkey

fr:Pemphredoninae